Ochi District may refer to:

 Ochi District, Ehime (越智郡)
 Ōchi District, Shimane (邑智郡)

See also
 Ochi (disambiguation)